Craig Curry (born August 5, 1950) is a former American football quarterback. Curry grew up in Coral Gables, Florida, and attended Coral Gables Senior High School. He was one of the most highly recruited high school quarterbacks in the country. He played for the Minnesota Golden Gophers from 1969 to 1971.  He led the Big Ten Conference in 1971 with 2,071 yards of total offense. He tried out with the Miami Dolphins in 1972.

History
 
Curry attended Carver High School until integration forced him to choose between all-black Mays High School or Coral Gables Senior High School. Curry chose to cross the color line and attend Gables, where he became known as "The Negro Quarterback". The team dominated the all-white competition, going 13-0, winning the state championship, and eventually being named "The Team of The Century" by the Florida High School Athletic Association. While at first white players refused to block for Curry, eventually they realized they could not succeed unless they worked together. The sport proved a great unifier, as black students initially were denied entrance to school activities, until the football coaches manned the doors in order to allow Curry and others to enter.	

Coach Nick Kotys endured much criticism for starting a black quarterback, as at the time they were not considered qualified for the position, but he started Curry because he deserved the position. After the team won the national championship in 1967, Kotys stated that "Craig does all the thinking. I only nod OK.". 
	
A Coral Gables High School guidance counselor advised him to drop science classes, because of the weakness of his math from Carver. Curry then devoted himself to football at the expense of academics, a decision he regretted later in life. He wanted to attend the University of Miami, but because of death threats, chose to attend Minnesota instead. He earned a degree in Psychology, and was drafted by the Miami Dolphins. After being cut, he considered suicide. He then went to work for IBM for the next 16 years. After that, he served as an academic advisor for athletes at the University of Michigan, then took a position as the director of the Center for the African-American Male at Albany State University in Georgia. He later served as athletic director of the University of Arkansas-Pine Bluff.

References

1950 births
Living people
Sportspeople from Coral Gables, Florida
Players of American football from Florida
American football quarterbacks
Minnesota Golden Gophers football players
Miami Dolphins players
IBM people
George Washington Carver School (Coral Gables, Florida) alumni